The Archaeological Museum of Granada is an archaeological museum in the Albayzín district, Granada, Spain. It was established in 1879.

The museum is located at 41, Carrera del Darro in the Castril palace, dating from the 16th century. It hosts many artefacts from a range of time periods, namely halls dedicated to Paleolithic and hominization process; Neolithic and Eneolithic; Bronze Age; Colonizations and Hispano-Roman peoples; Roman era, Late Roman and Paleo Christian; Hispano-Visigothic and Mozarab archeology; and Western Middle Ages and Hispano-Muslim Archeology.

It includes a Renaissance patio. The building's façade was created in 1593.

See also
 List of museums in Spain

References and notes

Much of the content of this article comes from the equivalent Spanish-language Wikipedia article, accessed December 1, 2006.

Granada
Museums in Granada
Museums established in 1879
1879 establishments in Spain